Grande Fratello VIP 7 (also known by the acronym GFVIP7)  is the seventh celebrity season of the Italian reality television franchise Grande Fratello, and was launched on September 19, 2022, on Canale 5.

Alfonso Signorini returned as the host of the main show, businesswoman Sonia Bruganelli (replaced during New Eve vacation by Soleil Sorge and Pierpaolo Pretelli only in the 25th and 26th live show) returned as opinionist and was joined by singer Orietta Berti (that replaced the opinionist of the previous season Adriana Volpe).

For the first time in Grande Fratello VIP history, it was announced that most of the housemates would be revealed directly during the first live show, with only a few exceptions.

Housemates 
The age of the housemates refers to the time of entry into the house.

Guests

Nominations table

Week 1 - Week 8 
  The housemate is immune.
  The housemate is nominated by Grande Fratello as a disciplinary measure.

Week 9 - Week 24 
  The contestant is immune.
  The contestant is not save and is nominated automatically.
  The contestant is evicted, returns to the game with ticket of return.
  The housemate is nominated by Grande Fratello as a disciplinary measure.

Week 25 - Finale 
  The contestant is immune.
  The contestant is evicted, returns to the game with ticket of return.

Notes

:
:
:

TV Ratings and guests 
Live shows

References

External links 
 Official site 

07